Boronia is the debut album from Australian duo Hockey Dad. The album was released in August 2016 by Farmer & the Owl.

Track listing

Personnel

Musicians
Hockey Dad
 Zach Stephenson – guitar, lead vocals 
 William Fleming – drums 

Additional musicians
 Stephen Bourke – bass guitar 
 Yuko Nishiyama – backing vocals 
 Tom Iansek – piano

Technical
 Jeff Rosenstock – production

Charts

References

2016 albums
Hockey Dad albums
Kanine Records albums